Whitted may refer to:

Albert Whitted Airport, small public airport in St. Petersburg, Florida, United States
Alvis Whitted (born 1974), American football player
Chiles-Whitted UFO Encounter on July 24, 1948, when two American commercial pilots a ner collision with a strange torpedo shaped object
J. Turner Whitted, computer scientist who invented recursive ray tracing
Pharez Whitted, jazz trumpeter, composer, and producer
Possum Whitted (1890–1962), Outfielder and Third Baseman
Virtue Hampton Whitted (1922–2007), jazz singer and bassist